Joseph H. Kinney (March 12, 1910 – March 12, 1975) was an American professional basketball player. He played in the National Basketball League for the Pittsburgh Pirates during the 1938–39 season and averaged 1.5 points per game in two career games played.

References

1910 births
1975 deaths
American men's basketball players
United States Army personnel of World War II
Centers (basketball)
Pittsburgh Pirates (NBL) players
West Virginia Wesleyan Bobcats basketball players
United States Army soldiers